Malcolm St. Clair (May 17, 1897 – June 1, 1952) was a Hollywood film director, writer, producer and actor.

Biography 
A disciple of Mack Sennett, St. Clair was an actor in many films primarily comedies. At 6'7" he can be seen in such Sennett films as Yankee Doodle in Berlin, towering over the other actors, playing Crown Prince Wilhelm. He later moved on to director and directed almost 100 films, as well as producing five others, between 1915 and 1948. His brother, Eric St Clair, was a writer and actor. He directed most of Laurel and Hardy's later films at 20th Century Fox, and at least two of the Jones Family series at the same studio.

St. Clair retired in 1948 with the closure of 20th Century Fox's B Unit. In 1950, he wanted to direct Buster Keaton in a television series, but ill health prevented him from directing again.

He died on June 1, 1952, at age 55 and was interred at Mountain View Cemetery and Mausoleum in Altadena, California.

Partial filmography 

 The Camera Cure (1917)
 His Baby Doll (1917)
 The Little Widow (1919)
 Yankee Doodle in Berlin (1919) Actor
 The Goat (1921)
 Bright Eyes (1921)
 The Blacksmith (1922)
 Christmas (1922)
 The Lighthouse by the Sea (1924)
 On Thin Ice (1925)
 Are Parents People? (1925)
 After Business Hours (1925)
 The Trouble with Wives (1925)
 A Woman of the World (1925)
 The Grand Duchess and the Waiter (1926)
 The Show-Off (1926)
 A Social Celebrity (1926)
 Good and Naughty (1926)
 Knockout Reilly (1927)
 Breakfast at Sunrise (1927)
 Gentlemen Prefer Blondes (1928)
 The Fleet's In (1928)
 The Canary Murder Case (1929)
 Side Street (1929)
 Dangerous Nan McGrew (1930)
 The Boudoir Diplomat (1930)
 Montana Moon (1930)
 Olsen's Big Moment (1933)
 Goldie Gets Along (1933)
 Crack-Up (1936)
 Hollywood Cavalcade (1939)
 Quick Millions (1939)
 Young As You Feel (1940)
 The Bashful Bachelor (1942)
 Jitterbugs (1943)
 The Dancing Masters (1943)
 Two Weeks to Live (1943)
 The Big Noise (1944)
 Swing Out the Blues  (1944)
 The Bullfighters (1945)

References

External links 

Malcolm St. Clair at Virtual History
Photo of Mal St. Clair with writer Anita Loos and actress Ruth Taylor.
Mal St. Clair photo gallery(ACertainCinema.com)

1897 births
1952 deaths
American male film actors
American male silent film actors
Film directors from California
Filmmakers from California
People from Greater Los Angeles
20th-century American male actors
Male actors from California
Film producers from California